Taiwanese Mandarin, Guoyu and colloquially as Huayu refers to Mandarin Chinese spoken in Taiwan. A large majority of the Taiwanese population is fluent in Mandarin, though many also speak a variety of Min Chinese known as Taiwanese Hokkien, commonly called Minnanyu, Southern Min, Taigi or Hokkien. This language has had a significant influence on Mandarin as spoken on the island.

Guoyu is not the indigenous language of Taiwan. Chinese settlers came to Taiwan in the 16th century but spoke other Chinese languages, primarily Southern Min, and Taiwanese indigenous peoples speak unrelated Austronesian languages. Japan annexed Taiwan in 1895 and governed the island as a colony for the next 50 years, during which time Japanese was introduced and taught in schools. With the defeat of Imperial Japan in World War II, Taiwan was handed to the Republic of China under the Kuomintang (KMT), which by 1950 had been pushed by the Chinese Communist Party (CCP) out of the mainland. The KMT promulgated Standard Mandarin as the national language while suppressing non-Mandarin languages in the public sphere in Taiwan. At the same time, in the People's Republic of China on the mainland, Putonghua was likewise promoted as the national language. 

Putonghua in mainland China and Guoyu in Taiwan are highly similar and derive from the same standard based on the phonology of the Beijing dialect of Mandarin Chinese and the grammar of written vernacular Chinese in the early 20th century. Standard Guoyu pronunciations tend to be based on prescribed dictionaries of the period, whereas Standard Putonghua integrated colloquial Northern Mandarin pronunciations for some words. Notable characteristics of Guoyu as is commonly spoken in Taiwan, include its somewhat different tonal qualities compared to Putonghua, the lack of the erhua phenomenon, and the lack of retroflex consonants (with zh-, ch-, sh- being pronounced like z-, c-, and s-). Guoyu also incorporates vocabulary from Minnanyu and Japanese. Written Chinese (both Guoyu and Chinese languages like Hakka and Minnanyu) in Taiwan generally uses traditional characters, in contrast to mainland China, excluding Hong Kong and Macau, where simplified Chinese characters were adopted beginning in the 1950s. Some grammatical differences also exist, often due to the influence of Minnanyu. The two forms of Mandarin evolved additional differences over the decades of political separation between the Republic of China in Taiwan and the People's Republic of China in the mainland, though both remain mutually intelligible. 

Guoyu spoken in Taiwan exists on a spectrum, from the most formal, standardized variety to the least formal, with the heaviest influence of non-Mandarin Chinese languages, primarily Minnanyu. On one end of the spectrum, there is Standard Guoyu, the official national language of the Republic of China (Taiwan). This variety is taught as the standard in the education system and is employed in official communications and most news media. The core of this standard variety is described in the Ministry of Education Mandarin Chinese Dictionary. Very few people speak purely standard Guoyu, however. Mandarin, as colloquially spoken in Taiwan, can be broadly called "Taiwan Guoyu". Taiwan Guoyu diverges in varying degrees from Standard Guoyu, with some speakers being closer to Standard Guoyu than others. These divergences are often the result of Taiwan Guoyu incorporating influences from other languages used in Taiwan, primarily Minnanyu, but also Japanese. Taiwan Guoyu is also mutually intelligible with Putonghua, but when compared with Standard Guoyu, Taiwan Guoyu exhibits greater differences in pronunciation, vocabulary, and grammar.

This article uses Taiwan Guoyu to refer to the colloquial varieties of Mandarin in Taiwan, Standard Guoyu for the prescribed standard form, Putonghua to refer to Standard mainland Chinese Mandarin, and simply Guoyu or Taiwanese Mandarin when a distinction is unnecessary.

Terms and definition
Chinese is not a single language but a group of languages in the Sinitic branch of the Sino-Tibetan family, which includes varieties such as Mandarin, Cantonese, and Hakka. They share a common ancestry and script, Chinese characters, and among Chinese speakers, they are popularly considered dialects ( fāngyán) of the same, overarching language. These dialects are often extremely divergent in the spoken form, however, and not mutually intelligible. Accordingly, Western linguists tend to treat them as separate languages rather than dialects of the same language, likening their relationship to that of English and Dutch, for example (both being West Germanic languages).

Mandarin Chinese is a grouping of Chinese languages that includes at least eight subgroups, often also called dialects. In English, "Mandarin" can refer to any of these Mandarin dialects, which are not necessarily mutually intelligible. However, the term is most commonly used to refer to Standard Chinese, the prestige dialect.

Standard Chinese in mainland China is called Putonghua and in the Republic of China (Taiwan) Guoyu. Both of these, as Mandarin languages, are based on the Beijing dialect of Mandarin and are mutually intelligible, but also feature various lexical, phonological, and grammatical differences. There exists significant variation within Putonghua and Guoyu as well. Some scholars have argued that Putonghua and Guoyu are artificial standards that, strictly speaking, do not represent the natively spoken language of a significant number of, or even any, people.

Guoyu exists on a continuum from the most standard, formal version of the language to the form most heavily influenced by Taiwanese Minnanyu. The former variety can be called Standard Guoyu (Biāozhǔn Guóyǔ) in contrast to the less standard Taiwan Guoyu (Táiwān Guóyǔ). More formal settings—such as television news broadcasts—tend to feature speakers using Standard Guoyu, which closely resembles mainland Putonghua, but is not generally used as a day-to-day language. Language falling on the less standard side of the Guoyu spectrum may be stigmatized as uneducated.

This article focuses on the features of both Standard Guoyu, particularly its relationship to Putonghua, as well as non-standard but widespread features of Mandarin in Taiwan, grouped under Taiwan Guoyu.

History and usage

Large-scale Han Chinese settlement of Taiwan began in the 17th century by Hoklo immigrants from Fujian province who spoke Southern Min languages (predominantly Hokkien), and to a lesser extent, Hakka immigrants who spoke their respective language. Taiwanese indigenous peoples already inhabited the island, speaking a variety of Austronesian languages unrelated to Chinese. In the centuries following Chinese settlement, the number of indigenous languages dropped significantly, with several going extinct, in part due to the process of sinicization.

Official communications among the Han were done in Mandarin, but the primary languages of everyday life were Minnanyu or Hakka. After its defeat in the First Sino-Japanese War, the Qing dynasty ceded Taiwan to the Empire of Japan, which governed the island as an Imperial colony from 1895 to 1945. By the end of the colonial period, Japanese had become the high dialect of the island as the result of decades of Japanization policy.

Under KMT rule 

After the Republic of China under the Kuomintang (KMT) gained control of Taiwan in 1945, Mandarin was introduced as the official language and made compulsory in schools, although the local population rarely spoke it at they time. Many who had fled the mainland after the defeat of the KMT by the Communists also spoke non-standard varieties of Mandarin, which may have influenced later colloquial pronunciations. Wu Chinese dialects were also influential due to the relative power of KMT refugees from Wu-speaking Zhejiang, Chiang Kai-shek's home province.

The Mandarin Promotion Council (now called National Languages Committee) was established in 1946 by Chief Executive Chen Yi to standardize and popularize the usage of Mandarin in Taiwan. The Kuomintang heavily discouraged the use of Southern Min and other non-Mandarin languages, portraying them as inferior, and school children were punished for speaking their non-Mandarin native languages. Guoyu was thus established as a lingua franca among the various groups in Taiwan at the expense of existing languages.

Post-martial law 

Following the end of martial law in 1987, language policy in the country underwent liberalization, but Guoyu remained the dominant language. Local languages were no longer proscribed in public discourse, mass media, and schools. English and "mother tongue education" (mǔyǔ jiàoyù) — Minnanyu and Hakka — were introduced as elective subjects in primary school in 2001. Greater time and resources are devoted to both Mandarin and English, which are compulsory subjects, compared to mother tongue instruction.

Mandarin is spoken fluently by the vast majority of the Taiwanese population, with the exception of some of the elderly population, who were educated under Japanese rule. In the capital of Taipei, where there is a high concentration of Mainlander descendants who do not natively speak Minnanyu, Mandarin is used in greater frequency and fluency than in other parts of Taiwan. The 2010 Taiwanese census found that in addition to Mandarin, Minnanyu was natively spoken by around 70% of the population, and Hakka by 15%. A 2004 study found that Mandarin was spoken more fluently by Hakka and Taiwanese aboriginals than their respective mother tongues; Hoklo groups, on average, spoke better Minnanyu, but Hoklo under 50 years old still spoke significantly better Mandarin (with comparable levels of fluency to their usage of Minnanyu) than the elderly. Overall, while both national and local levels of government have taken some measures to promote the use of non-Mandarin Chinese languages, younger generations generally prefer using Mandarin.

Government statistics from 2020 found that 66% of Taiwanese residents use Guoyu as their primary language, and another 31% use it as a secondary language (32% used Minnanyu as their primary language, and 54% used it as a secondary language). Guoyu is the primary language for over 80% of people in the northern areas of Taipei, Taoyuan, and Hsinchu. Youth is correlated with use of Guoyu: in 2020, over two-thirds of Taiwanese over 65 used Minnanyu or Hakka as their primary language, compared with just 11% of 15–24-year-olds.

Script
Guoyu employs traditional Chinese characters (which are also used in the two special administrative regions of China, Hong Kong and Macau), rather than the simplified Chinese characters used in mainland China. Literate Taiwanese can generally understand a text in simplified characters.

Shorthand characters 

In practice, Taiwanese Mandarin users may write informal, shorthand characters (also  sútǐzì) in place of the full traditional forms. These variant Chinese characters are generally easier to write by hand and consist of fewer strokes. Shorthand characters are often identical to their simplified counterparts, but they may also take after Japanese kanji, or differ from both, as shown in the table below.

In informal writing, Guoyu speakers may replace possessive particles  de or  zhī with the Japanese particle  no in hiragana (usually read as de), which serves a nearly identical grammatical role. No is often used in advertising, where it evokes a sense of playfulness and fashionability, and handwriting, as it is easier to write.

Braille
Taiwanese braille is similar to Mainland Chinese braille, though several sounds are represented by different patterns. Both systems represent the sounds of the language (as do Pinyin and Zhuyin), not Chinese characters themselves.

Transliteration

Zhuyin Fuhao 

While pinyin is used in applications such as in signage, most Guoyu users learn phonetics through the Zhuyin Fuhao system, popularly called Zhuyin or Bopomofo, after its first four glyphs. Taiwan is the only Chinese-speaking polity to use the system, which is taught in schools (often used as ruby characters to aid young learners) and represents the dominant digital input method on electronic devices. (Before the introduction of Hanyu pinyin starting in 1958, it was also used in mainland China, whereas today in the mainland it is used primarily in language education and in some dictionaries.) It has accordingly become a symbol of Taiwanese identity as well.

Romanization

Chinese language romanization in Taiwan somewhat differs from on the mainland, where Hanyu Pinyin is the official standard. A competing system, Tongyong Pinyin, was formally revealed in 1998 with the support of the mayor of Taipei Chen Shuibian. In 1999, however, the Legislative Yuan endorsed a slightly modified version of Hanyu Pinyin, creating parallel romanization schemes along largely partisan lines, with Kuomintang-supporting areas using Hanyu Pinyin, and Democratic Progressive Party (DPP) areas using Tongyong Pinyin. In 2002, the Taiwanese government led by the DPP promulgated the use of Tongyong Pinyin as the country's preferred system, but this was formally abandoned in 2009 in favor of Hanyu Pinyin.

In addition, various other historical romanization systems also exist across the island, with multiple systems sometimes existing in the same locality. Following the defeat of the Kuomintang in the Chinese Civil War and their subsequent retreat to Taiwan in 1945, little emphasis was placed on the romanization of Chinese characters, with the Wade-Giles system used as the default. It is still widely used for transcribing people's legal names today. The Gwoyeu Romatzyh method, invented in 1928, also was in use in Taiwan during this time period, albeit to a lesser extent. In 1984, Taiwan's Ministry of Education began revising the Gwoyeu Romatzyh method out of concern that Hanyu Pinyin was gaining prominence internationally. Ultimately, a revised version of Gwoyeu Romatzyh was released in 1986, which was called Mandarin Phonetic Symbols II. However, this system was not widely adopted.

Phonology

Standard Guoyu

Like Putonghua, both Standard and Taiwan Guoyu are tonal. Pronunciation of many individual characters differs in the standards prescribed by language authorities in Taipei and Beijing. Mainland authorities tended to adopt pronunciations popular in Northern Mandarin areas, whereas Taiwanese authorities prefer traditional pronunciations recorded in dictionaries from the 1930s and 1940s. Some examples of differences are given later in this section.

These character-level differences notwithstanding, Standard Guoyu pronunciation is largely identical to Putonghua, but with two major systematic differences (also true of Taiwan Guoyu):
 Erhua, the rhotacization of certain morphemes with the suffix - -er, is very rare in Guoyu (and very common in Beijing Putonghua).
 The "neutral tone" ( qīngshēng) does not occur as often, so final syllables generally retain their tone (e.g.,  dànshì,  xiānshēng). 
 This tendency to retain original tone is not present in words ending noun suffixes such as - -zi or - -tou ; Guoyu speakers would not pronounce  as *háizǐ.

In addition, two other phenomena, while nonstandard, are extremely common across all Mandarin speakers in Taiwan, even the highly educated:
 The retroflex sounds zh- , ch- , and sh-  merge into the alveolar consonants (z- , c- , s- , respectively).

Taiwan Guoyu
Taiwan Guoyu pronunciation is strongly influenced by Minnanyu. This is especially prominent in areas where Minnanyu is common, namely, in Central and Southern Taiwan. Many, though not all, of the phonological differences between Taiwan Guoyu and Putonghua can be attributed to the influence of Minnanyu.

Notable phonological features of Taiwan Guoyu include:

This phenomenon is not unique to Taiwan and can be found in Mandarin dialects across southern China as well as parts of northern China.
 The ability to produce retroflex sounds is considered a hallmark of "good" Mandarin (i.e. Standard Guoyu); some speakers may hypercorrect to pronounce alveolar consonants as their retroflex counterparts when attempting to speak "proper" Guoyu.
 The initial f- becomes a voiceless bilabial fricative , closer to a light 'h' in standard English (for example,  fǎn →  huǎn).
 The syllable written as eng after labials (in pinyin, b-, f-, m-, p- and w-) is pronounced ong. Thus,  fēng may be pronounced as fōng. 
The deletion of  also happens in colloquial Putonghua, but less frequently.
 The initials n- and l- are sometimes interchangeable, particularly preceding nasal finals (i.e. -n, -ng). Thus,  nán may be pronounced lán.
 The nasal finals -n and -ng tend to merge, so words like  zhēng and  zhēn may become homophones.
 The endings -uo, -ou, and -e (when it represents a close-mid back unrounded vowel  like in  hē) shift to a mid central vowel  or merge into the mid back rounded vowel -o .
 The close front rounded vowel in words such as  yǔ become unrounded, transforming into yǐ.
 The diphthong -ei  and the triphthong -ui  are monophthongized into .

Reduction 
The non-standard Taiwanese Guoyu tends to exhibit frequent, informal elision and cluster reduction when spoken. For example,  zhè yàngzi 'this way, like so' can be pronounced similar to  jiàngzi 'paste, sauce'; wherein the "theoretical" retroflex (so called because it is a feature of Standard Guoyu but rarely realized in everyday speech, as zh- is usually pronounced z-; see above section) is assimilated into the palatal glide .

Often the reduction involves the removal of initials in compound words, such as dropping the t in  jīntiān 'today' or the ch in  fēicháng 'extremely, very'. These reductions are not necessarily a function of the speed of speech than of register, as it is more commonly used in casual conversations than in formal contexts.

Tone quality

Like all varieties of Mandarin, Guoyu is a tonal language. Putonghua as spoken in the mainland has five tones, including the neutral tone. Tones in Guoyu differ somewhat in pitch and contour.

Research suggests that speakers of Guoyu articulate the second and third tones differently from the standards of Beijing Mandarin. The precise nature of the tonal differences is not well attested, however, as relevant studies often lack a sufficiently large variety of speakers. Tones may vary based on age, gender, and other sociolinguistic factors and may not even be consistent across every utterance by an individual.

In general, for Guoyu speakers, the second tone does not rise as high in its pitch, and the third tone does not "dip" back up from the low, creaky voice range. Overall, Guoyu speakers exhibit a lower and more narrow pitch range than speakers of the Mandarin of Beijing. Acoustic analysis of 33 Mandarin speakers from Taiwan in 2008 also found that for many speakers, the second tone tends to have a dipping contour more akin to that of the prescriptive third tone.

Standard pronunciations compared to Putonghua
In addition to differences in elision and influence from Minnanyu, which are not features that are codified in the standard Guoyu, there are differences in pronunciation that arise from conflicting official standards in Taiwan and the mainland.

Quantification of the extent of pronunciation differences between Guoyu and Putonghua varies. Estimates from graduate-level research include a 2008 study based on the 7,000 characters in the List of Commonly Used Characters in Modern Chinese, which found approximately 18% differed between Guoyu and Putonghua, and 13% for the 3,500 most commonly used characters. A 1992 study, however, found differences in 22.5% of the 3,500 most common characters.

Much of the difference can be traced to the preferences of linguistic authorities on the two sides; the mainland standard prefers popular pronunciations in northern areas, whereas the Taiwanese standard prefers those documented in dictionaries in the 1930s and 1940s. The Taiwanese formal standards may not always reflect actual pronunciations commonly used by actual Taiwanese speakers of Guoyu.

The following is a table of relatively common characters pronounced differently in Guoyu and Putonghua in most or all contexts (Guoyu/Putonghua): 

Note that many of the above include tonal differences where a first tone in Putonghua is pronounced second tone in Guoyu.
Some pronunciation differences may only appear in certain words. The following is a list of examples of such differences (Guoyu/Putonghua):
  'and' — hé, hàn / hé. In Guoyu, the character may be read as hàn when used as a conjunction, whereas it is always read hé in Putonghua.
  'to expose' — pùlù / bàolù. The pronunciation bào is used in all other contexts in Guoyu.
  'quality; mass' — zhíliàng / zhìliàng.  is pronounced zhí in most contexts in Guoyu, except in select words like  rénzhì 'hostage' or  zhìyā 'to pawn'. Zhíliàng means 'mass' in both Guoyu and Putonghua, but for Guoyu speakers it does not also mean 'quality' (instead preferring  pǐnzhí for this meaning). 
  'unhurried, calm' — cōngróng / cóngróng.  cóng is only pronounced cōng in this specific word in Guoyu.
  'stutter' — kǒují / kǒuchī.  is only read jí when it means 'to stammer' (as opposed to 'to eat', the most common meaning).

Vocabulary differences from mainland Putonghua Guoyu and Putonghua share a large majority of their vocabulary, but significant differences do exist. The lexical divergence of Guoyu from Putonghua is the result of several factors, including the prolonged political separation of the mainland and Taiwan, the influence of Imperial Japanese rule on Taiwan until 1945, and the influence of Minnanyu. The Cross Strait Common Usage Dictionary categorizes differences as "same word, different meaning" ( tóngmíng yìshí — homonyms); "same meaning, different word" ( tóngshí yìmíng); and "Taiwan terms" ( Táiwān yòngyǔ) and "mainland terms" ( dàlù yòngyǔ) for words and phrases specific to a given side.

Same meaning, different word
The political separation of Taiwan and mainland China after the end of the Chinese Civil War in 1949 contributed to many differences in vocabulary. This is especially prominent in words and phrases which refer to things or concepts invented after the split; thus, modern scientific and technological terminology often differs greatly between Putonghua and Guoyu.

In computer science, for instance, the differences are prevalent enough to hinder communication between Guoyu and Putonghua speakers unfamiliar with each other's respective dialects. Zhang (2000) selected four hundred core nouns from computer science and found that while 58% are identical in Standard and Taiwanese Mandarin, 22% were "basically" or "entirely" different.

As cross-strait relations began to improve in the early 21st century, direct interaction between mainland China and Taiwan increased, and some vocabulary began to merge, especially by means of the Internet. For example, the words  píngjǐng 'bottleneck' and  zuòxiù 'to grandstand, show off' were originally unique to Guoyu in Taiwan but have since become widely used in mainland China as well. Guoyu has also incorporated mainland phrases and words, such as  qúdào, meaning 'channel (of communication)', in addition to the traditional Guoyu term,  guǎndào.

Words may be formed from abbreviations in one form of Mandarin but not the other. For example, in Taiwan, bubble tea,  zhēnzhū nǎichá, is often abbreviated  zhēnnǎi, but this is not common on the mainland. Likewise, traffic rules/regulations,  jiāotōng guīzé, is abbreviated as  jiāoguī on the mainland, but not in Taiwan.

Same word, different meaning
Some identical terms have different meanings in Guoyu and Putonghua. There may be alternative synonyms which can be used unambiguously by speakers on both sides.

The same word carry different connotations or usage patterns in Guoyu and Putonghua, and may be polysemous in one form of Mandarin but not the other. For example,  lǒngluò in Guoyu means 'to convince, win over', but in Putonghua, it carries a negative connotation (cf. 'beguile, coax').  kuāzhāng means 'to exaggerate,' but in Taiwan, it can also be used to express exclamation at something absurd or overdone, a meaning that is not present in Putonghua. Another example is  xiǎojiě, meaning 'miss' or 'young lady', regularly used to address young women in Guoyu. On the mainland, however, the word is also a euphemism for a prostitute and is therefore not used as a polite term of address.

Differing usage or preferenceGuoyu and Putonghua speakers may also display strong preference for one of a set of synonyms. For example, both  lǐbài and  xīngqí (xīngqī in Putonghua) are acceptable words for 'week' in Guoyu and Putonghua, but  is more common in Taiwan.Guoyu tends to preserve older lexical items that are less used in the mainland. In Taiwan, speakers may use a more traditional  zǎo'ān to say 'good morning', whereas mainland speakers generally default to  zǎoshang hǎo, for instance. Both words are acceptable in either dialect.

Likewise, words with the same literal meaning in either dialect may differ in register.  éryǐ 'that's all, only' is common both in spoken and written Guoyu, influenced by speech patterns in Minnanyu, but in Putonghua the word is largely confined to formal, written contexts.

Preference for the expression of modality often differs among northern Mandarin speakers and Taiwanese, as evidenced by the selection of modal verbs. For example, Taiwanese Mandarin users strongly prefer  yào and  búyào over  děi and  bié, respectively, to express 'must' and 'must not', compared to native speakers from Beijing. However,  yào and  búyào are also predominantly used among Mandarin speakers from the south of the mainland. Both pairs are grammatically correct in either dialect.

 Words specific to Guoyu
Some words in Putonghua may not exist in Guoyu and vice versa. Authors of the Dictionary of Words Which Differ Across the Taiwan Strait estimate there are about 2,000 words unique to Guoyu, around 10% of which come from Minnanyu. Additionally, many terms unique to Guoyu were adopted from Japanese as a result of Taiwan's status as a Japanese colony during the first half of the 20th century.

Some of the vocabulary differences stem from different social and political conditions, which gave rise to concepts that were not shared between the mainland and Taiwan, e.g.  fúcǎi, a common abbreviation for the China Welfare Lottery of the People's Republic of China, or  shíbāpā, which refers to the 18% preferential interest rate on civil servants' pension funds in Taiwan. ( pā as "percent" is also unique to Guoyu.)

Particles

Modal particles convey modality, which can be understood as a speaker's attitude towards a given utterance (e.g. of necessity, possibility, or likelihood that the utterance is true). Modal particles are common in Chinese languages and generally occur at the end of sentences, and so are commonly called sentence-final particles or utterance-final particles.Guoyu employs some modal particles that are rare in Putonghua. Some are entirely unique to spoken, colloquial Taiwan Guoyu, and identical particles may also have different meanings in Putonghua and Guoyu. Conversely, particles that are common in Putonghua — particularly northern Putonghua, such as that spoken in Beijing — are very rare in Guoyu. Examples include  bei,  me, and  bàle.

 lā is a very common modal particle in Guoyu, which also appears in Putonghua with less frequency and always as a contraction of  le and  a. In Guoyu, it has additional functions, which Lin (2014) broadly defines as "to mark an explicit or implicit adjustment" by the speaker to a given claim or assessment. In more specific terms, this use includes expression of impatience or displeasure (a, below); an imperative, such as a suggestion or order, especially a persistent one (b), and rejection or refutation (c).

Wu (2006) argues lā is influenced by a similar la particle in Minnanyu. (Unlike in Putonghua, Guoyu speakers will use lā immediately following le, as seen in (a).)

 (a) Impatience or displeasure 

 Go to sleep already! [You] have to go to class tomorrow!

 (b) Suggestion or order
 A:  I'm so full!
 B:  Don't be so polite, have another bowl!

 (c) Rejection or refutation 
 A:  He married so early, it has to be [because of] a pregnancy.  
 B:  There's no way.

Taiwan Guoyu has functionally adopted some particles from Minnanyu. For example, the particle hoⁿh [] functions in Minnanyu as a particle indicating a question to which the speaker expects an affirmative answer (c.f. English "..., all right?" or "..., aren't you?"). Among other meanings, when used in Taiwan Guoyu utterances, it can indicate that the speaker wishes for an affirmative response, or may mark an imperative.

Loan words and transliteration
Loan words may differ between Putonghua and Guoyu. Different characters or methods may also be chosen for transliteration (phonetic or semantic), and the number of characters may differ. In some cases, words may be loaned as transliterations in one dialect but not the other. Generally, Guoyu tends to imitate the form of Han Chinese names when transliterating foreign persons' names.

From MinnanyuGuoyu has borrowed words from Minnanyu, such as  fānshǔ 'sweet potato' and 拜拜 bàibài 'to worship'. In Minnanyu, the prefix  a (Guoyu: ā) carries an affection or intimate tone when referring to people, and this has been adopted into Guoyu. Thus, words like  āmèi 'younger sister' may be used instead of the standard  mèimèi, and public figures like Tsai Ing-wen may be referred to as  Āyīng.

Whether these loans are pronounced with their Minnanyu or Guoyu reading varies. In general, as a loan becomes more commonly recognized, it is more likely to be read as Guoyu. This may involve the transformation of characters into their Guoyu counterparts. Some words may not be represented by well known characters and are instead written with English letters, such as Q, from the Minnanyu word 𩚨 khiū, referring to a soft, chewy texture in foods. Some compound words or phrases may combine characters representing Minnanyu and Guoyu words.

From Japanese
Japanese in the early 20th century had a significant influence on modern Chinese vocabulary. The Japanese language saw the proliferation of neologisms to describe concepts, and terms learned through contact with the West in the Meiji and Taishō eras. Thus, the creation of words like  minshu 'democracy',  kakumei 'revolution' and  saimin 'hypnotize', which were then borrowed into Chinese and pronounced as Chinese words. Both Guoyu and Putonghua retain these words today.Guoyu was also further influenced by Japanese. As a result of Imperial Japan's 50-year rule over Taiwan until 1945, Minnanyu (and Hakka) borrowed extensively from Japanese, and Guoyu in turn borrowed some of these words from Minnanyu, such that Japanese influence can be said to have come via Minnanyu. For example, the Minnanyu word  (Peh-oe-ji: kòngku) 'to lose completely', which has been borrowed into Guoyu, originates from Japanese sukonku ('skunk'), with the same meaning. Other examples of Guoyu loans from Japanese via Minnanyu include  yùnjiàng, 'driver, chaffeur', from  unchan and  ōubāsāng, 'elderly woman', from  おばさん obasan.

In general, Japanese loanwords are more widespread in Guoyu than Putonghua. Guoyu continues to borrow words from Japanese in the 21st century, especially among youth, for whom Japanese culture is particularly attractive.

Grammar
The grammar of Guoyu is largely identical to Putonghua. As is the case with lexicon and phonology described above, salient grammatical differences from Putonghua often stem from the influence of Minnanyu.

 Perfective 有 yǒu 
To mark the perfect verbal aspect, Guoyu employs  (yǒu) where  (le) would be used in the strictly standard form of the language. For instance, a Guoyu speaker may ask "" ("Have you seen a doctor?") whereas a Putonghua speaker would prefer "". This is due to the influence of Minnanyu grammar, which uses  (ū) in a similar fashion.

In both Guoyu and Putonghua,  yǒuméiyǒu can precede a verb phrase to mark a perfective question, as in (1), and in Guoyu, this can be split (2):
(1)  ("Did you apply for a visa?")
(2)  (Guoyu only)

 Auxiliary verbs 

Another example of the influence of Minnanyu grammar on Guoyu is the use of  huì as "to be" (a copula) before adjectives, in addition to the usual meanings "would" or "will". Compare typical ways to render "Are you hot?" and "I am (not) hot" in Putonghua, Guoyu, and Minnanyu:

'Will he come?' — is also a notable feature of Guoyu. It is not necessarily considered ungrammatical in Putonghua, but is very rare. Sanders (1992), analyzing speech by groups of Mandarin speakers from Taipei and Beijing, found that the latter group never used  to mean 'will' in this manner spontaneously (preferring instead  Tā lái ma?). For them, speakers of Mandarin from Taiwan may be perceived as overusing .

 Compound (separable) verbs 

Speakers of Guoyu may frequently avoid splitting separable verbs, a category of verb + object compound words that are split in certain grammatical contexts in standard usage. For example, the verb  bāngmáng 'to help; to do a favor', is composed of bāng 'to help, assist' plus máng 'to be busy; a favor'. This is not true of every separable verb in Guoyu'', and prescriptive texts still opt to treat these verbs as separable.

Notes

Citations

References 

 

 

 
 
 

Languages of Taiwan
Mandarin Chinese
Taiwanese culture
Chinese language